In mathematics, the pin group is a certain subgroup of the Clifford algebra associated to a quadratic space. It maps 2-to-1 to the orthogonal group, just as the spin group maps 2-to-1 to the special orthogonal group.

In general the map from the Pin group to the orthogonal group is not surjective or a universal covering space, but if the quadratic form is definite (and dimension is greater than 2), it is both.

The non-trivial element of the kernel is denoted  which should not be confused with the orthogonal transform of reflection through the origin, generally denoted

General definition

Let  be a vector space with a non-degenerate quadratic form . The spin group  is defined similarly, but with  restricted to be even; it is a subgroup of the pin group.

In this article,  is always a real vector space. When  has basis vectors  satisfying  and   the pin group is denoted Pin(p, q).

Since every orthogonal transformation can be expressed as a composition of reflections (the Cartan–Dieudonné theorem), it follows that this representation of the pin group is a homomorphism from the pin group onto the orthogonal group. This is often called the twisted adjoint representation. The elements ±1 of the pin group are the elements which map to the identity , and every element of O(p, q) corresponds to exactly two elements of Pin(p, q).

Definite form

The pin group of a definite form maps onto the orthogonal group, and each component is simply connected (in dimension 3 and higher): it double covers the orthogonal group. The pin groups for a positive definite quadratic form Q and for its negative −Q are not isomorphic, but the orthogonal groups are.

In terms of the standard forms, O(n, 0) = O(0, n), but Pin(n, 0) and Pin(0, n) are in general not isomorphic. Using the "+" sign convention for Clifford algebras (where ), one writes

and these both map onto O(n) = O(n, 0) = O(0, n).

By contrast, we have the natural isomorphism Spin(n, 0) ≅ Spin(0, n) and they are both the (unique) non-trivial double cover of the special orthogonal group SO(n), which is the (unique) universal cover for n ≥ 3.

Indefinite form

There are as many as eight different double covers of O(p, q), for p, q ≠ 0, which correspond to the extensions of the center (which is either C2 × C2 or C4) by C2. Only two of them are pin groups—those that admit the Clifford algebra as a representation. They are called Pin(p, q) and Pin(q, p) respectively.

As topological group
Every connected topological group has a unique universal cover as a topological space, which has a unique group structure as a central extension by the fundamental group. For a disconnected topological group, there is a unique universal cover of the identity component of the group, and one can take the same cover as topological spaces on the other components (which are principal homogeneous spaces for the identity component) but the group structure on other components is not uniquely determined in general.

The Pin and Spin groups are particular topological groups associated to the orthogonal and special orthogonal groups, coming from Clifford algebras: there are other similar groups, corresponding to other double covers or to other group structures on the other components, but they are not referred to as Pin or Spin groups, nor studied much.

In 2001, Andrzej Trautman found the set of all 32 inequivalent double covers of O(p) x O(q), the maximal compact subgroup of O(p, q) and an explicit construction of 8 double covers of the same group O(p, q).

Construction
The two pin groups correspond to the two central extensions

The group structure on Spin(V) (the connected component of determinant 1) is already determined; the group structure on the other component is determined up to the center, and thus has a ±1 ambiguity.

The two extensions are distinguished by whether the preimage of a reflection squares to ±1 ∈ Ker (Spin(V) → SO(V)), and the two pin groups are named accordingly. Explicitly, a reflection has order 2 in O(V), r2 = 1, so the square of the preimage of a reflection (which has determinant one) must be in the kernel of Spin±(V) → SO(V), so , and either choice determines a pin group (since all reflections are conjugate by an element of SO(V), which is connected, all reflections must square to the same value).

Concretely, in Pin+,  has order 2, and the preimage of a subgroup {1, r} is C2 × C2: if one repeats the same reflection twice, one gets the identity.

In Pin−,  has order 4, and the preimage of a subgroup {1, r} is C4: if one repeats the same reflection twice, one gets "a rotation by 2π"—the non-trivial element of Spin(V) → SO(V) can be interpreted as "rotation by 2π" (every axis yields the same element).

Low dimensions

In 1 dimension, the pin groups are congruent to the first dihedral and dicyclic groups:

In 2 dimensions, the distinction between Pin+ and Pin− mirrors the distinction between the dihedral group of a 2n-gon and the dicyclic group of the cyclic group C2n.

In Pin+, the preimage of the dihedral group of an n-gon, considered as a subgroup Dihn < O(2), is the dihedral group of a 2n-gon, Dih2n < Pin+(2), while in Pin−, the preimage of the dihedral group is the dicyclic group Dicn < Pin−(2).

The resulting commutative square of subgroups for Spin(2), Pin+(2), SO(2), O(2) – namely C2n, Dih2n, Cn, Dihn – is also obtained using the projective orthogonal group (going down from O by a 2-fold quotient, instead of up by a 2-fold cover) in the square SO(2), O(2), PSO(2), PO(2), though in this case it is also realized geometrically, as "the projectivization of a 2n-gon in the circle is an n-gon in the projective line".

In 3 dimensions the situation is as follows. The Clifford algebra generated by 3 anticommuting square roots of -1 is the algebra , and Pin−(3) is isomorphic to SU(2) × C2. These groups are nonisomorphic because the center of Pin+(3) is C4 while the center of Pin−(3) is C2 × C2.

Center
Suppose .

Name
It is a back-formation from Spin: "Pin is to O(n) as Spin is to SO(n)", hence dropping the "S" from "Spin" yields "Pin".

Notes

References

 
 
 
 
 
 
 
 

Lie groups